Liam Higgins (born 13 November 1942) is an Irish professional golfer. He won the 1977 Kerrygold International Classic, a European Tour event, at his home club, Waterville Golf Links. After reaching 50, he had a successful senior career, winning three times on the European Seniors Tour and being runner-up a further five times.

His sons Brian and David are also professional golfers.

Higgins set a world long-drive record in 1984, hitting a ball 634 yards on the runway at Baldonnel Military Airport in Dublin.

Professional wins (6)

European Tour wins (1)

Safari Circuit wins (1)
1977 Kenya Open

Other wins (1)
1983 Irish PGA Championship

European Senior Tour wins (3)

Results in major championships

Note: Higgins only played in The Open Championship.

CUT = missed the half-way cut
"T" = tied

References

External links

Irish male golfers
European Tour golfers
European Senior Tour golfers
Sportspeople from County Kerry
1942 births
Living people